Ugala is a theatre in Viljandi, Estonia. 

The theatre was founded in 1920 opening on January 10 of that year. The first production was Oscar Wilde's "Salome".

Ugala's Artistic Directors
1925 - 1926: Andres Särev
1926 – 1928: Eduard Lemberg
1928 – 1932: Alfred Mering
1932 – 1933: Valter Soosõrv
1933 – 1934: Karl Merits
1934 – 1936: Alfred Mering
1936 – 1941: Eduard Tinn
1942 – 1943: Jullo Talpsepp
1943 – 1945: Eero Neemre
1945 – 1947: Karl Ader
1947 – 1948: Enn Toona
1949 – 1970: Aleks Sats
1970 – 1979: Heino Torga
1979 – 1983: Jaan Tooming
1983 – 1988: Jaak Allik
1989 – 1991: Kalju Komissarov
1991 – 1995: Jaak Allik 
1995 – 1998: Andres Lepik
1998 – 2000: Andres Noormets
2000 – 2002: Jaak Allik
2002 - 2003, 2009: Peeter Tammearu
2002 - 2009: artistic director Peter Tammearu (theater director since 2003) 
2009 - 2012: head of the theater  and head stage director Indrek Sammul
2012 - 2013: head of the theater  and head stage director  
2014 - 2019: theater director  and creative director Ott Aardam
2019 - :

References

External links

 

 

Theatres in Estonia
1920 establishments in Estonia
Theatres built in the Soviet Union
Viljandi